Barbu Bellu (1825–1900) was a Romanian baron, minister of culture, and minister of justice. Bellu Cemetery, the most famous cemetery in Romania, sits on a plot of land donated by Barbu Bellu to the local administration.

A member of the Bellu family, of Aromanian origin, he was born in Bucharest. He studied at home and then in Greece around the year 1843. In 1850, he became a judge of the Ilfov County courthouse and in 1852, the presiding judge of the same courthouse. He was a prosecutor at Curtea de Argeș in 1856 and starting 1859, a judge at the Romanian High Court of Justice.

In 1862, Barbu Bellu was named the minister of culture, but he resigned in June after Prime Minister Barbu Catargiu, his cousin, was assassinated. In 1863, he was the Minister of Justice in the Kretzulescu cabinet for one month.

He was a Member of Parliament, representing Muscel County in 1859, 1861, and 1864. In 1866, Austrian Emperor Franz Josef gave him the title of baron. After Alexandru Ioan Cuza abdicated, Barbu Bellu retired from public life. 

When he died in 1900, the newspapers wrote, Se stinse Baronul Bellu, cel cu automobelu ("Baron Bellu, the one with an automobellu, has died"). He was buried in the cemetery that bears his name.

Notes

References
Dimitrie R. Rosetti (1897) Dicționarul contimporanilor, Editura Lito-Tipografiei "Populara".

1825 births
1900 deaths
Nobility from Bucharest
Romanian people of Aromanian descent
Romanian Ministers of Culture
Romanian Ministers of Justice
Members of the Chamber of Deputies (Romania)
Romanian prosecutors
19th-century Romanian judges
Burials at Bellu Cemetery